Les Scélérats (English title: The Wretches) is a 1960 French drama film directed by Robert Hossein who co-stars with Michèle Morgan, Olivier Hussenot and Jacqueline Morane. It is also known as "The Blackguards".

Plot
The film tells the story of an American couple (coming to in Paris after having lost their only child) and their maid.

Principal cast
Michèle Morgan as  Thelma Rooland 
Robert Hossein as  Jess Rooland 
Olivier Hussenot as  Arthur Martin 
Jacqueline Morane as  Adeline Martin

References

External links

1960 films
French drama films
1960s French films